Mackie Lake may refer to:

Mackie Lake (Manitoba), Canada
Mackie Lake (Ontario), Canada, north of Plevna, Ontario
Mackie Lake, Wisconsin, United States - see List of lakes in Wisconsin (Polk County)